× Aliceara, abbreviated Alcra. in the horticultural trade, is the nothogenus for intergeneric hybrids between three orchid genera (Brassia × Miltonia × Oncidium).

References

Orchid nothogenera
Oncidiinae